Jazeel Murphy (born 27 February 1994) is a Jamaican sprinter.

As early as 2009, he has been dubbed Jamaica's next great sprinter. At the 2011 CARIFTA Games, Murphy ran a 10.27 sec to win the boys U20 100 metres title.

Personal bests

Achievements

References

External links

1994 births
Living people
Jamaican male sprinters